Agar is both a surname and a given name.

People with the surname
Alf Agar (1904–1989), English footballer
Allan Agar (born 1949) (father of Richard Agar), English rugby league footballer and coach
Andrew Agar (cricketer) (born 1956), English cricketer
Ashton Agar (born 1993), Australian cricketer
Augustus Agar (1890–1968), British Royal Navy commodore and recipient of the Victoria Cross
Carl Agar (1901–1968), Canadian pioneering aviator
Charles Agar (disambiguation), several people
Charles d'Agar (1669–1723), French painter
Edward Agar, 5th Earl of Normanton (1910–1967), a British and Irish peer and landowner 
Eileen Agar (1899–1991), British painter and photographer
George Agar, 1st Baron Callan (1751–1815), Irish politician
George Agar (rugby league) (1902-1966), Australian rugby league footballer
Herbert Agar (1897–1980), American journalist and editor, and Pulitzer Prize winner
Jacques d'Agar (1640–1716), French portrait painter, son of Charles d'Agar
James Agar (disambiguation), several people
John Agar (1921–2002), American actor and husband of Shirley Temple
John Agar (born 1946), Australian nephrologist
John Samuel Agar (1773–1858), English portrait painter and engraver
Madeline Agar (1874–1967), English landscape designer, sister of Wilfred
Malik Agar, Sudanese politician
Mehmet Ağar (born 1951), Turkish former police chief, politician, government minister and leader of the Democratic Party
Nat Agar (1888–1978), English-American soccer player, coach, referee, team owner and league executive
Nicholas Agar (born 1965), Australian professor of ethics
Richard Agar (son of Allan Agar), English rugby league footballer and coach
Shaun Agar, 6th Earl of Normanton (1945–2019), a British and Irish landowner and powerboat racer 
Sidney James Agar, 4th Earl of Normanton (1865–1933), British and Irish peer 
Welbore Ellis Agar (1735–1805), commissioner of HM Revenue and Customs and art collector
Welbore Ellis Agar, 2nd Earl of Normanton (1778—1868), Irish peer and landowner
Wes Agar (born 1997), Australian cricketer
Wilfred Eade Agar (1882–1951), Anglo-Australian zoologist, brother of Madeline
William Agar (1814–1906), English cricketer
William Seth Agar (1815–1872), English Roman Catholic priest

Given name

In Russian
In the Russian language, the name "" (Agar) is used predominantly in the biblical context and derives from "Hagar"—a person mentioned in the Book of Genesis. In 1924–1930, the name was included into various Soviet calendars.

People with the given name
Agar Adamson (1865–1929), a well-to-do Canadian who married the Toronto heiress Mabel Cawthra
Agar Rodney Adamson (1901–1954), Canadian mining engineer and politician
Agar Wynne (1850–1934), Australian politician

References

Notes

Sources
[1] А. В. Суперанская (A. V. Superanskaya). "Современный словарь личных имён: Сравнение. Происхождение. Написание" (Modern Dictionary of First Names: Comparison. Origins. Spelling). Айрис-пресс. Москва, 2005. 
[2] А. В. Суперанская (A. V. Superanskaya). "Словарь русских имён" (Dictionary of Russian Names). Издательство Эксмо. Москва, 2005.